The South Elkhorn Township is a township located in the county of Warren in the State of Missouri.

Population

In the year 2010 the township has 7249 inhabitants.

Geography

The South Elkhorn Township has an area of 71.04 km2, 69.04 km2 is terrain and 2 km2 is water.

References

Townships in Marion County, Missouri